Scott Rouse was the D&D Brand Manager at Wizards of the Coast, and part of the production staff for the fourth edition of Dungeons & Dragons.

Career
Scott Rouse, Brand Manager for Dungeons & Dragons at Wizards of the Coast, and D&D Licensing Manager Linae Foster created a new Open Gaming License (OGL) after the departure of its creator Ryan Dancey. On April 18, 2007, Wizards of the Coast announced that it would not be renewing Paizo Publishing's licenses for Dragon and Dungeon and Rouse stated, "Today the internet is where people go to get this kind of information. By moving to an online model we are using a delivery system that broadens our reach to fans around the world." Rouse and Foster worked on a new OGL to support the fourth edition of Dungeons & Dragons beginning in 2007, which became the Game System License by 2008. Rouse was the only remaining openly supportive employee of open gaming at Wizards of the Coast when he left the company on October 12, 2009.

References

American game designers
Living people
Place of birth missing (living people)
Year of birth missing (living people)